Tony Rotherham is an English historian, living history re-enactor, film extra, teacher, fight choreographer, stuntman, weapon expert and Robin Hood. He was previously Nottingham's official Robin Hood and has been doing this kind of work for many years.

Rotherham trained at the Andrew Van Der Hauser Academy of Sword in the Netherlands and learned a very high degree of combat. He worked in film and television as a fight choreographer and actor for many years.

Rotherham has been studying the history of Robin Hood ever since he was 18 years old, including the history behind the ballads. He has been giving lectures on the subject for over 20 years and is also the founder of several successful and award-winning historical recreation societies: Spirit of England, The Company of the White Boar, Sea Thieves Pirate Association and Stand and Deliver The English Highwayman's Association.

Film and TV work

Rotherham played King James in the documentary 'The Battle of Flodden', and Sam Gregory in the Channel 5 documentary 'The Real Dick Turpin'. He was the assistant director additional scenes in a 1999 film adaptation of King Lear, and has worked on many other films, including Highlander 1 & 2, Merlin The Quest Begins and several documentaries.

Sources
The official website (used with permission), The Tales of Robin Hood, Prof Dr. R. Rotherham, Robin Hood's World Wide Society and the BBC.

References

People from Nottingham
Living people
Action choreographers
English historians
Male actors from Nottinghamshire
English male film actors
English male television actors
Year of birth missing (living people)